Fagopyrin is a  term used for several closely related naturally occurring substances in the buckwheat plant.
Their chemical structure contains a naphthodianthrone skeleton similar to that of hypericin.  

Fagopyrin is located almost exclusively in the cotyledons of the buckwheat herb. When ingested, fagopyrins cause sensitivity to light.

References

External links
Phytopharmaka VII: Forschung und klinische Anwendung

Piperidines
Phenols
Plant toxins
Quinones